Orthocanthoides aristae is a species of tephritid or fruit flies in the genus Orthocanthoides of the family Tephritidae.

Distribution
Kenya.

References

Tephritinae
Insects described in 1987
Diptera of Africa